Henry VIII and His Six Wives  is a four-part British documentary first broadcast in 2016 about Henry VIII and his wives, chronicling his turbulent private life and how it shaped Britain.

In April 2016, Leeds historian Dan Jones co-wrote and co-presented, with Dr. Suzannah Lipscomb, Henry VIII and His Six Wives which was shown on Channel 5.

Episode list

References

External links
 

2016 British television series debuts
2016 British television series endings
2010s British documentary television series
Channel 5 (British TV channel) original programming
2010s British television miniseries
Documentaries about historical events
English-language television shows
Cultural depictions of the wives of Henry VIII